Limgha (सत्यवती गाउपलिका वार्ड नम्बर ४ लिम्घा) is a rural municipality ward no 4 and (सत्यवती) village council ward no 4 in Gulmi District in the Lumbini Zone of central Nepal. At the time of the 1991 Nepal census it had a population of 3285 persons living in 665 individual households.

Gallery

References

External links
UN map of the municipalities of Gulmi District

Populated places in Gulmi District